Balsamus, l'uomo di Satana  is a 1970 Italian film. It is the debut film of director Pupi Avati.

Cast 
 Bob Tonelli as Balsamus
 Greta Vaillant as Lorenza
 Giulio Pizzirani as Ottavio
 Gianni Cavina as Alliata
 Antonio Avati as Dorillo

Style
Despite the title and promotional material for the film, film historian Roberto Curti discussed the films genre, declaring it to not be a horror film, but a film that "embodies elements of comedy, with an insistence on regional types, but its main feature is grotesque."

Production
Balsamus, l'umo di Satana was a production with a crew of people director Pupi Avati knew personally. The film was written by Avati and his friends Enzo Leonardo and Giorgio Celli.
Avati's brother, Antonio Avati acts in the film as Dorillo. Avati later described the script as one "with in-depth linguistic, lexical and historical research. We put everything we could in it and more, in the illusion of being appreciated by who knows who or where. Which did not happen."

The films lead of Ariano Nanetti (credited as Bob Tonelli) was a local entrepreneur who Avati had me through his assistant Alberto Bartolani. Nanetti was not a professional actor, but a young entrepreneur who stated he could raise one billion Italian lire for the film. Nanetti was hired by Avati, who showed up to the set with a person he introduced as "Mister X" who signed checks for 160 million lire. "Mister X"'s identity was of businessman Carmine Domenico Rizzo.

Balsamus, l'umo di Satana was filmed on location near Bologna and at Incir-De Paolis in Rome.

Release
Balsamus, l'uomo di Satana was only submitted to the board of censors in Italy in January 1970, nearly two years afters it finished production. It was released in Italy on 28 January 1970 where it was distributed by I.F.C. The film grossed a total of 34 million Italian lire domestically.

References

Footnotes

Sources

External links

 

Italian comedy films
Films directed by Pupi Avati
1970 directorial debut films
1970 films
Films shot in Rome
1960s Italian films
1970s Italian films